Caucasian peoples may refer to:

 The Peoples of the Caucasus, various ethnic groups inhabiting the Caucasus region
 Peoples speaking the languages restricted to the Caucasus area: Kartvelian (South Caucasian), Northwest Caucasian, and Northeast Caucasian
 Caucasian race
 White people